The Klockerin, formerly also called the Glockerin or Glocknerin, is a twin-peaked mountain in the Glockner Group on the ridge of Fuscher/Kapruner Kamm in the High Tauern, a range within the Central Alps in the Austrian state of Salzburg. The two summits are about 240 metres apart. A prominent arête runs westwards; the west-northwestern arête is a short, but knife-edge ridge of rock. The Klockerin has a mighty Northwest Face which is 920 metres high and has a gradient of 54°. The mountain is geographically dominant compared with the southern and western neighbouring peaks. Especially from the west, where the Mooserboden Reservoir (surface at 2,036 m) lies, the Klockerin appears as a mighty massif. The mountain was first climbed on 18 September 1869 by German alpinist, Karl Hofmann, Prague merchant, Johann Stüdl and mountain guides, Thomas Groder and Josef Schnell from Kals am Großglockner.

References

Literature and maps 
 Willi End: Glocknergruppe, Alpine Club Guide Bergverlag Rother, Munich, 2003, 
 Eduard Richter: Die Erschliessung der Ostalpen, III. Band, Verlag des Deutschen und Oesterreichischen Alpenvereins, Berlin, 1894
 Alpine Club map 1:25,000 series, Sheet 40, Glocknergruppe

Alpine three-thousanders
Mountains of the Alps
Glockner Group
Mountains of Salzburg (state)